The 2012 Malaysia FA Cup, also known as the Astro Piala FA due to the competition's sponsorship by Astro Arena, was the 23rd season of the Malaysia FA Cup, a knockout competition for Malaysia's state football association and clubs.

Terengganu FA were the defending champions.

The cup winner qualified for the 2013 AFC Cup.

Format
Several changes have been made to the competition for 2012. The number of participating teams was increased from 30 to 32 and because of this, the defending champions and runners up in the first round would not receive byes as in previous seasons.

Just like the previous edition, the first two rounds would be single matches. The quarter finals and semi finals would be played over two legs while the final will be played at National Stadium, Bukit Jalil, Kuala Lumpur, on Saturday, 19 May 2012.

Cambodian outfit Preah Khan Reach have been invited for the first time.

The winner of the 2012 edition will qualify for the 2013 AFC Cup.

Matches
The draw for the 2012 Piala FA was held on 13 December 2011 at Wisma FAM.

Bracket

Round of 32
The legs were played on 17, 18 & 19 February 2012.

Round of 16
The legs were played on 9 & 10 March 2012.

Quarter-finals
The first legs were played on 23 and 24 March 2012, and the second legs on 27 March 2012.

|}

First leg

Second leg

Semi-finals
The first leg matches will be played on 21 April 2012, with the second legs to be held on 1 May 2012.

|}

First leg

Second leg

Final

The final was played at National Stadium, Bukit Jalil, Kuala Lumpur, on Saturday, 19 May 2012.

Winners

Season statistics

Top scorers

See also
 2012 Malaysia Super League
 2012 Malaysia Premier League
 2012 Malaysia FAM League

References

 
2012 domestic association football cups
FA